Baghbar Assembly constituency is one of the 126 assembly constituencies of Assam Legislative Assembly. Baghbar forms part of the Barpeta Lok Sabha constituency.

Town Details 

Following are the details of Baghbar Assembly constituency:

 Country: India.
 State: Assam.
 District: Barpeta.
 Lok Sabha Constituency: Barpeta.
 Assembly Categorisation: Rural.
 Literacy Level: 65.03%.
 Eligible Electors as per 2021 General Elections: 1,65,834 Eligible Electors. Male Electors:85,783  Female Electors:80,048.
 Geographic Co-Ordinates: 26°11’29.8"N 90°50’12.1"E.
 Total Area Covered: 500 square kilometres.
 Area Includes: Baghbar thana [excluding Jania (Part) and Titapani mouzas] in Barpeta sub-division.
 Inter-state Border: Barpeta.

Members of Legislative Assembly 
 1967: J. Ahmed, Independent.
 1972: Jalal Uddin, Indian National Congress.
 1978: Ibrahim Ali, Indian National Congress.
 1983: Ibrahim Ali, Indian National Congress.
 1985: Sheikh Abdul Hamid, Independent.
 1991: Dildar Rezza, Indian National Congress.
 1996: Sheikh Abdul Hamid, United Minorities Front (Assam).
 2001: Dildar Rezza, Indian National Congress.
 2006: Dildar Rezza, Indian National Congress.
 2011: Sherman Ali Ahmed, All India United Democratic Front.
 2016: Sherman Ali Ahmed, Indian National Congress.
 2021: Sherman Ali Ahmed, Indian National Congress.

Election results

2016 result

References

External links 
 

Assembly constituencies of Assam